The 2021 Super Start Batteries 188 was a NASCAR Xfinity Series race held on February 20, 2021. It was contested over 56 laps—extended from 52 laps due to an overtime finish—on the  asphalt road course. It was the second race of the 2021 NASCAR Xfinity Series season. Joe Gibbs Racing driver Ty Gibbs, in his first career start, collected his first career Xfinity Series win.

Background 
Added as a replacement for the cancelled Production Alliance Group 300 because of California restrictions related to the COVID-19 pandemic, the 2021 race was scheduled for 52 laps on the  road course, it was the second race of the 2021 NASCAR Xfinity Series season.

Entry list 

 (R) denotes rookie driver.
 (i) denotes driver who is ineligible for series driver points.

Qualifying
Brett Moffitt was awarded the pole for the race as determined by competition-based formula.

Starting Lineups

Race

Race results

Stage Results 
Stage One
Laps: 15

Stage Two
Laps: 30

Final Stage Results 

Laps: 52

Race statistics 

 Lead changes: 11 among 8 different drivers
 Cautions/Laps: 7 for 14
 Time of race: 2 hours, 35 minutes, and 5 seconds
 Average speed:

References 

NASCAR races at Daytona International Speedway
2021 in sports in Florida
Super Start Batteries 188
2021 NASCAR Xfinity Series